Little Wenlock is a civil parish in the district of Telford and Wrekin, Shropshire, England.  It contains 15 listed buildings that are recorded in the National Heritage List for England.  Of these, one is at Grade II*, the middle of the three grades, and the others are at Grade II, the lowest grade.  The parish contains the village of Little Wenlock and the surrounding countryside.  Most of the listed buildings are houses and associated structures, cottages, farmhouses and farm buildings, a high proportion of which are timber framed and which date from the 16th and 17th centuries, and the other listing building is a church.


Key

Buildings

References

Citations

Sources

Lists of buildings and structures in Shropshire